o-Phenylenediamine (OPD) is an organic compound with the formula C6H4(NH2)2.  This aromatic diamine is an important precursor to many heterocyclic compounds. It is isomeric with m-phenylenediamine and p-phenylenediamine.

Preparation
Commonly, 2-nitrochlorobenzene is treated with ammonia and the resulting 2-nitroaniline, whose nitro group is then reduced:
ClC6H4NO2 + 2 NH3 → H2NC6H4NO2 + NH4Cl

H2NC6H4NO2 + 3 H2 → H2NC6H4NH2 + 2 H2O

In the laboratory, the reduction of the nitroaniline is effected with zinc powder in ethanol, followed by purification of the diamine as the hydrochloride salt. This compound darkens in air; impurities may be removed by treating a hot aqueous solution with sodium dithionite (reducing agent) and activated carbon, then allowing the product to cool and crystallize.

Reactions and uses
o-Phenylenediamine condenses with ketones and aldehydes to give rise to a variety of useful products.  Its reactions with carboxylic acids and their derivatives produce benzimidazoles. The herbicides benomyl and fuberidazole are made in this manner. Thiophanate-methyl is another herbicide produced from o-phenylenediamine.

Quinoxalinedione may be prepared by condensation of o-phenylenediamine with dimethyl oxalate. Condensation with xanthate esters affords mercaptoimidazoles, which are used as antioxidants in rubber products. Treatment with nitrous acid gives benzotriazole, a corrosion inhibitor. Condensation of substituted o-phenylenediamine with various diketones is used in the preparation of a variety of pharmaceuticals.

In coordination chemistry, phenylenediamine is an important ligand precursor. Schiff base derivatives, such as those derived from salicylaldehyde, are excellent chelating ligands. Oxidation of its metal-phenylenediamine complexes affords the diimine derivatives, which are intensely colored and often exist in multiple stable oxidation states.

Safety
With an LD50 of 44 mg/L (in water), o-phenylenediamine is about 1000 times less toxic than the para-isomer. Anilines are typically handled as if they are carcinogenic. For many applications, OPD has been replaced by safer alternatives such as 3,3',5,5'-tetramethylbenzidine.

References

Diamines
Anilines
Chelating agents